William Lee Lawrence (born January 19, 1989) is an American politician and businessman serving as a member of the Kentucky House of Representatives from the 70th district. Elected in November 2020, he assumed office on January 1, 2021.

Background 
Lawrence attended a Christian high school and graduated from an industrial maintenance trade school. Since 2015, Lawrence has operated Lawrence Development and Rental Properties. He was elected to the Kentucky House of Representatives in 2020 and assumed office in January 2021.

References 

1989 births
Living people
People from Maysville, Kentucky
People from Mason County, Kentucky
Republican Party members of the Kentucky House of Representatives